STARLUX Airlines is a Taiwanese international airline company headquartered in Taipei, Taiwan, and operated its first flight from Taipei to Macau on 23 January 2020.

History
The company was registered in 2016 with the Taiwanese Ministry of Economic Affairs. This was confirmed by Chang Kuo-wei
on 30 November 2016, who was formerly the chairman of Taiwanese airline EVA Air. The airline registered with the Taiwanese Civil Aeronautics Administration in the first half of 2017, and it was planned, in late 2016, that the airline would commence operations in 2018. The Taiwanese Ministry of Economic Affairs received the formal application for establishing the airline under the name Starlux Airlines on 22 May 2017. In an interview in 2017, the airline was expected to start operations by the end of 2019, though in January 2019, Chang stated that Starlux Airlines would launch in January 2020.

In March 2019, the airline's chairman Chang Kuo-wei signed an order for 17 Airbus A350 XWB aircraft, which was also the country's largest single Airbus purchase agreement. In September 2019, the airline announced the first destinations to be launched, consisting of Da Nang, Macau, and Penang to begin on 23 January 2020. On 25 October 2019, the airline's first aircraft, an Airbus A321neo, was delivered from Hamburg, Germany, before the plane arrived at the airline's hub at Taoyuan International Airport on 29 October after making stops in Dubai and Bangkok. On 10 December 2019, Starlux received its air operator's certificate (AOC) from the Taiwanese Civil Aeronautics Administration, followed by the formal opening of reservations on 16 December 2019 for the start of services the following month.

Due to the COVID-19 pandemic and its impacts on aviation, which began to occur within months of the airline's inauguration, Starlux announced the suspension of most of its services except to Da Nang. Subsequently, in March 2020 the airline suspended all of its operations until 2 June 2020, after which the airline resumed its three-weekly services to Macau. Before the airline resumed service, it received clearance in May 2020 to begin services to Naha as its first destination in Japan, with a start date no earlier than 1 July, however the airline said that the timeline for Naha's service inauguration was dependent on the pandemic's developments. Subsequently, due to the pandemic, the airline additionally delayed the launch of its Cebu services twice, and indefinitely postponed the launch of its services to Naha.

Since its establishment in May 2018 until November 2022, the airline has had a cumulative operating loss of NT$11.16 billion, with NT$3.91 billion in financial year 2020 and NT$4.04 billion in financial year 2021.

In August 2022, Starlux announced its plan to expand its services to North America in April 2023 as the travel industry starts to recover from the impacts of the COVID-19 pandemic, along with services to Indonesia in the future. In September 2022, the airline announced long term plans to fly domestic routes within Taiwan with ATR aircraft, although no definite timeline has been set. 

In February 2023, the airline confirmed its plans to introduce North America services, with regular flights to Los Angeles set for 26 April 2023, following the delivery of the first two Airbus A350s in October 2022.

Destinations
Starlux Airlines operates or has operated to the following destinations :

Fleet

, Starlux Airlines operates an all-Airbus fleet composed of the following aircraft:

Fleet development

In March 2019, Starlux announced it would start operations with 17 Airbus aircraft, consisting of 5 Airbus A350-900s and 12 Airbus A350-1000s for routes to Europe & North America as well as selected Asian destinations. The airline later planned to add 10 Airbus A321neos to its fleet to serve their Asian routes. In November 2019, Starlux decided to swap four Airbus A350-1000 orders to four A350-900s. Hence, since the start of 2020, the orders stands at 9 A350-900s and 8 A350-1000s.

Starlux had also considered the addition of the Airbus A330neo to its fleet. This was followed by the airline placing an order for 8 Airbus A330-900s, alongside three additional A321neos and one leased A350-900 to its order backlog on 10 September 2020. Starlux also announced during September 2020 that its Airbus A350s would feature a first class cabin. During 2022, Starlux decided to swap all Airbus A350-1000 orders to A350-900s.

As part of the plans, Starlux became the first Taiwanese airline to fly the Airbus A321neo, and Airbus A330-900.

In October 2022, Starlux received their first Airbus A350-900 at Airbus Headquarters in Toulouse, France. Their CEO personally flew this aircraft back to Taiwan. The airline became the first to take delivery of the next generation of Airbus A350 aircraft, which notably features wider cabins and electronically tinted windows by default.

Cabins and services

In-flight entertainment
In-flight entertainment (IFE) is provided through seatback touchscreen systems, which are equipped with a USB power port and contain a selection of audio and video on demand (AVOD), as well as a live position mapping system. Starlux commissioned smooth jazz guitarist Peter White to provide a soundtrack for the entertainment system, which was commercially released on 29 November 2019 as Music for STARLUX Airlines. The airline also offers in-flight internet access through satellite Wi-Fi. All passengers have access to an inflight meal preorder service, where specific dishes can be preordered in advance.

First class 
First class is offered only on Airbus A350-900 aircraft, with cabins featuring four seats in a 1-2-1 configuration. The seats can be converted into a fully lie-flat setting and features a door along with a 60-inch (152 cm) high partition. The seats include a personal mini-bar along with a 32 in (81.3 cm) video screen and a personal wardrobe. The cabin notably features no bulkhead separation with the business class cabin behind.

Business class

The Airbus A350-900 business class cabin features 26 seats in a 1-2-1 configuration that can be converted into a fully flat bed. The seats each features a 48.5 inch (123.2 cm) door and partition and are individually equipped with a 24 inch (61 cm) video screen.

On the Airbus A330-900, the business class cabin features 28 Safran Skylounge Core seats configured in a 1-2-1 seating layout. The seats can be converted into fully flat beds and are each equipped with a  4K IFE touchscreen. 

The Airbus A321neo business class cabin has eight Collins Diamond seats in a 2-2 configuration.

Wi-Fi internet access, meals, refreshments, and amenities including noise-cancelling headphones and blankets are provided complimentary to all business class passengers.

Premium Economy class 
Premium economy class is offered only on the Airbus A350-900, featuring 36 Recaro PL3530 seats in a 2-4-2 configuration. The seats feature a 40-inch pitch and are individually equipped with calf-rests and footrests, along with a 15.6 inch (39.6 cm) IFE touchscreen monitors.

Economy class

The Airbus A350-900 and the Airbus A330-900 shares a similar economy class cabin featuring Recaro 3710 seats in a 3-3-3 and 2-4-2 configuration, respectively. The seats are each equipped with a 13 inch (33 cm) IFE touchscreen monitor.

On the A321neo, the economy class cabin has 180 seats in a 3-3 configuration. Meals and some amenities such as pillows and headsets are provided complimentary, while Wi-Fi internet access only strong enough for in-flight messaging is freely available to all economy class passengers, with increased bandwidth and faster connection speeds available for an additional fee.

See also

 List of airports in Taiwan
 List of airlines of Taiwan
 List of companies of Taiwan
 Transportation in Taiwan
 Air transport in Taiwan

References

Airlines of Taiwan
Taiwanese brands
Companies based in Taipei
Airlines established in 2016
Taiwanese companies established in 2016